Evan Christopher Roe (born February 9, 2000) is an American actor. He is best known for portraying Jason McCord on the CBS political drama series Madam Secretary from 2014 to 2019.

Career 
Roe began working as a child actor at the age of 12, appearing in a 2012 episode of Disney Channel's Jessie. Between 2014 and 2019 he portrayed Jason McCord on Madam Secretary, and in 2019 appeared in director Tayarisha Poe's feature debut Selah and the Spades.

In 2022, Roe was cast in Netflix's upcoming limited series A Man in Full.

Personal Life 
Roe briefly attended the Professional Performing Arts School and graduated from New York University in 2022.

Filmography

Film

Television

References 

2000 births
Living people
21st-century American male actors
Male actors from Seattle
American male child actors
American male television actors